Sir Frederick Grant Banting  (November 14, 1891 – February 21, 1941) was a Canadian medical scientist, physician, painter, and Nobel laureate noted as the co-discoverer of insulin and its therapeutic potential.

In 1923, Banting and John Macleod received the Nobel Prize in Medicine. Banting shared the honours and award money with his colleague, Charles Best. That same year, the government of Canada granted Banting a lifetime annuity to continue his work. As to this day, Frederick Banting, who received the Nobel Prize at age 32, remains the youngest Nobel laureate for Physiology/Medicine.

Early years

Frederick Banting was born on November 14, 1891, in a farmhouse near Alliston, Ontario. The youngest of five children of William Thompson Banting and Margaret Grant, he attended public high school in Alliston. In 1910, he started at Victoria College, part of the University of Toronto, in the General Arts program. After failing his first year, he petitioned to join the medical program in 1912 and was accepted. He began medical school in September 1912.

In 1914, he attempted to enter the army on August 16, and then again in October, but was refused due to poor eyesight. Banting successfully joined the army in 1915 and spent the summer training before returning to school. His class was fast-tracked to get more doctors into the war and so he graduated in December 1916 and reported for military duty the next day. He was wounded at the Battle of Cambrai in 1918. Despite his injuries, he helped other wounded men for sixteen hours, until another doctor told him to stop. He was awarded the Military Cross in 1919, for heroism. In 1918, he was awarded the license to practise medicine, surgery, and midwifery by the Royal College of Physicians of London.

Banting returned to Canada after the war and went to Toronto to complete his surgical training. He studied orthopedic medicine and, in 1919–1920, was Resident Surgeon at The Hospital for Sick Children. Banting was unable to gain a place on the hospital staff and so he decided to move to London, Ontario to set up a medical practice. From July 1920 to May 1921, he continued his general practice, while teaching orthopedics and anthropology part-time at the University of Western Ontario in London because his medical practice had not been particularly successful. From 1921 to 1922 he lectured in pharmacology at the University of Toronto. He received his M.D. degree in 1922, and was also awarded a gold medal.

Medical research

Isolation of insulin 

An article he read about the pancreas piqued Banting's interest in diabetes. Banting had to give a talk on the pancreas to one of his classes at the University of Western Ontario on November 1, 1920, and he was therefore reading reports that other scientists had written. Research by Naunyn, Minkowski, Opie, Sharpey-Schafer, and others suggested that diabetes resulted from a lack of a protein hormone secreted by the islets of Langerhans in the pancreas. Schafer had named this putative hormone "insulin". The hormone was thought to control the metabolism of sugar; its lack led to an increase of sugar in the blood which was then excreted in urine. Attempts to extract insulin from ground-up pancreas cells were unsuccessful, likely because of the destruction of the insulin by the proteolysis enzyme of the pancreas. The challenge was to find a way to extract insulin from the pancreas prior to its destruction.

Moses Barron published an article in 1920 which described experimental closure of the pancreatic duct by ligature; this further influenced Banting's thinking. The procedure caused deterioration of the cells of the pancreas that secrete trypsin which breaks down insulin, but it left the islets of Langerhans intact. Banting realized that this procedure would destroy the trypsin-secreting cells but not the insulin. Once the trypsin-secreting cells had died, insulin could be extracted from the islets of Langerhans. Banting discussed this approach with J. J. R. Macleod, professor of physiology at the University of Toronto. Macleod provided experimental facilities and the assistance of one of his students, Charles Best. Banting and Best, with the assistance of biochemist James Collip, began the production of insulin by this means.

As the experiments proceeded, the required quantities could no longer be obtained by performing surgery on living dogs. In November 1921, Banting hit upon the idea of obtaining insulin from the fetal pancreas. He removed the pancreases from fetal calves at a William Davies slaughterhouse and found the extracts to be just as potent as those extracted from the dog pancreases. By December 1921, he had also succeeded in extracting insulin from the adult pancreas. Pork and beef would remain the primary commercial sources of insulin until they were replaced by genetically-engineered bacteria in the late 20th century. On January 11, 1922, the first ever injection of insulin was given to 14-year-old Canadian Leonard Thompson at Toronto General Hospital. In spring of 1922, Banting established a private practice in Toronto and began to treat diabetic patients. His first American patient was Elizabeth Hughes Gossett, daughter of U.S. Secretary of State Charles Evans Hughes.

Banting and Macleod were jointly awarded the 1923 Nobel Prize in Physiology or Medicine. Banting split his half of the Prize money with Best, and Macleod split the other half of the Prize money with James Collip.

After insulin 

Banting was appointed Senior Demonstrator in Medicine at the University of Toronto in 1922. Next year he was elected to the new Banting and Best Chair of Medical Research, endowed by the Legislature of the Province of Ontario. He also served as Honorary Consulting Physician to the Toronto General, the Hospital for Sick Children, and the Toronto Western Hospital. At the Banting and Best Institute, he focused his research on silicosis, cancer, and the mechanisms of drowning.

In 1938, Banting's interest in aviation medicine resulted in his participation with the Royal Canadian Air Force (RCAF) in research concerning the physiological problems encountered by pilots operating high-altitude combat aircraft. Banting headed the RCAF's Number 1 Clinical Investigation Unit (CIU), which was housed in a secret facility on the grounds of the former Eglinton Hunt Club in Toronto.

During the Second World War he investigated the problems of aviators, such as "blackout" (syncope). He also helped Wilbur Franks with the invention of the G-suit to stop pilots from blacking out when they were subjected to g-forces while turning or diving. Another of Banting's projects during the Second World War involved using and treating mustard gas burns. Banting even tested the gas and antidotes on himself to see if they were effective.

Public statements

Statements on Hudson's Bay Company 

During his 1927 Arctic trip with A. Y. Jackson, Banting realized that crew or passengers on board the Hudson's Bay Company (HBC) paddle wheeler SS Distributor were responsible for spreading the influenza virus down the Slave River and Mackenzie River, a virus that had over the summer and autumn spread territory-wide, devastating the aboriginal population of the north. Returning from the trip, Banting gave an interview in Montreal with a Toronto Star reporter under the agreement that his statements on HBC would remain off the record. The conversation was nonetheless published in the Toronto Star and rapidly reached a wide audience across Europe and Australia. Banting was angry at the leak, having promised the Department of the Interior not to make any statements to the press prior to clearing them.

The article noted that Banting had given the journalist C. R. Greenaway repeated instances of how the fox fur trade always favoured the company: "For over $100,000 of fox skins, he estimated that the Eskimos had not received $5,000 worth of goods." He traced this treatment to health, consistent with reports made in previous years by RCMP officers, suggesting that "the result was a diet of 'flour, biscuits, tea and tobacco,' with the skins that once were used for clothing traded merely for 'cheap whiteman's goods.

The fur trade commissioner for the Hudson's Bay Company called Banting's remarks "false and slanderous", and a month later, the governor and general manager of HBC met Banting at the King Edward Hotel to demand a retraction. Banting stated that the reporter had betrayed his confidence, but did not retract his statement and reaffirmed that HBC was responsible for the death of indigenous residents by supplying the wrong kind of food and introducing diseases into the Arctic. As A. Y. Jackson notes in his memoir, since neither the governor nor the general manager had been to the Arctic, the meeting ended with them asking Banting's advice on what HBC ought to do: "He gave them some good advice and later he received a card at Christmas with the Governor's best wishes."

Banting also maintained this position in his report to the Department of the Interior:He noted that "infant mortality was high because of the undernourishment of the mother before birth"; that "white man’s food leads to decay of native teeth"; that "tuberculosis has commenced. Saw several cases at Godhavn, Etah, Port Burwell, Arctic Bay"; that "an epidemic resembling influenza killed a considerable proportion of population at Port Burwell"; and that "the gravest danger faces the Eskimo in his transfer from a race-long hunter to a dependent trapper. White flour, sea-biscuits, tea and tobacco do not provide sufficient fuel to warm and nourish him." Furthermore, he discouraged the establishment of an Arctic hospital. The "proposed hospital at Pangnirtung would be a waste of money, as it could be reached by only a few natives." Banting's report contrasted starkly with the bland descriptions provided by the ship's physician, F. H. Stringer.

Personal life

Banting married twice. His first marriage was to Marion Robertson in 1924; they had one child, William (1929–1998). They divorced in 1932 and Banting married Henrietta Ball in 1937.

In February 1941, Banting died of wounds and exposure following the crash of a Lockheed L-14 Super Electra/Hudson in which he was a passenger, in Musgrave Harbour, Newfoundland. After departing from Gander, Newfoundland, both of the plane's engines failed. The navigator and co-pilot died instantly, but Banting and the pilot, Captain Joseph Mackey, survived the initial impact. According to Mackey, the sole survivor, Banting died from his injuries the next day. Banting was en route to England to conduct operational tests on the Franks flying suit developed by his colleague Wilbur Franks.

Banting and his wife are buried at Mount Pleasant Cemetery in Toronto.

Painting 
Banting developed an interest in painting beginning around 1921 while he was in London, Ontario. Some of his first pieces were done on the back of the cardboard in which his shirts were packed by the dry-cleaners. He became friends with the Group of Seven artists A. Y. Jackson and Lawren Harris, fellow members of the Arts and Letters Club of Toronto, sharing their love of the rugged Canadian landscape. Writing on Banting, Jackson recalls that "He did not want to make a business of art and would tell [would-be purchasers] to go buy a Lismer or something else and then he would exchange it for one of his."  An obituary said, "A member of the Arts and Letters Club of Toronto, he was one of Canada's most accomplished amateur painters."

In 1927, he made a sketching trip with Jackson to the St. Lawrence River in Quebec. Later that year, they travelled to RCMP outposts in the Arctic on the Canadian government supply ship Beothic. The sketches, done both in oils on birch panels and in pen and ink, were named after the places he visited: Craig Harbour, Ellesmere Island; Pond Inlet, Baylot Island; Eskimo tents at Etach; others were untitled. A collection of Banting’s paintings was acquired by and donated to the Owens Art Gallery at Mount Allison University in 1928. Jackson and Banting also made painting expeditions to Great Slave Lake, Walsh Lake (Northwest Territories), Georgian Bay, French River and the Sudbury District.

At the time of his death in 1941, Banting was one of Canada's best-known amateur painters. Dennis Reid, the former director of Collections and Research at the Art Gallery of Ontario, views Banting's works as very much "part of the Jackson story".

Legacy

In 1994, Banting was inducted into the Canadian Medical Hall of Fame. In 2004, he was nominated as one of the top 10 "Greatest Canadians" by viewers of the Canadian Broadcasting Corporation. When the final votes were counted, Banting finished fourth behind Tommy Douglas, Terry Fox and Pierre Trudeau.

Namesakes 

Banting's namesake, the Banting Research Foundation, was created in 1925 and provides funding to support health and biomedical research in Canada.

Banting's name is immortalized in the yearly Banting Lectures, given by an expert in diabetes, and by the creation of the Banting and Best Department of Medical Research of the University of Toronto; Sir Frederick G Banting Research Centre located on Sir Frederick Banting Driveway in the Tunney's Pasture complex, Ottawa, ON; Banting Memorial High School in Alliston, ON; Sir Frederick Banting Secondary School in London, ON; Sir Frederick Banting Alternative Program Site in Ottawa, ON; Frederick Banting Elementary School in Montréal-Nord QC and École Banting Middle School in Coquitlam, BC.

The "Major Sir Frederick Banting, MC, RCAMC Award for Military Health Research", sponsored by the True Patriot Love Foundation, is awarded annually by the Surgeon General to the researcher whose work presented at the annual Military and Veterans Health Research Forum is deemed to contribute most to military health. It was first awarded in 2011 in the presence of several Banting descendants.

The "Canadian Forces Major Sir Frederick Banting Term Chair in Military Trauma Research" at Sunnybrook Health Sciences Centre was established in 2012. The first Chair holder is Colonel Homer Tien, Medical Director of Sunnybrook's Tory Regional Trauma Centre and Senior Specialist and Trauma Adviser to the Surgeon General.

The Banting Postdoctoral Fellowship Program is administered by the Canadian Institutes of Health Research, the Natural Sciences and Engineering Research Council of Canada, and the Social Sciences and Humanities Research Council of Canada. The fellowship provided up to two years of funding at $70,000 per year to researchers in health, natural sciences, engineering, social sciences and humanities.

Properties 

Banting House, his former home located in London, Ontario, was declared a National Historic Site of Canada in 1997. The Banting Interpretation Centre in Musgrave Harbour, Newfoundland and Labrador is a museum named after him which focuses on the circumstances surrounding the 1941 plane crash which claimed his life. The crater Banting on the Moon is also named after him for his contributions to medicine.

During the voting for "Greatest Canadians" in late 2003, controversy rose over the future use of the Banting family farm in New Tecumseth which had been left to the Ontario Historical Society by Banting's late nephew, Edward, in 1998. The dispute centred on the future use of the 40 ha (100 acre) property and its buildings. In a year-long negotiation, assisted by a provincially appointed facilitator, the Town of New Tecumseth offered $1 million to the Ontario Historical Society (OHS). The town intended to turn the property over to the Sir Frederick Banting Legacy Foundation for preservation of the property and buildings, and the Legacy Foundation planned to erect a Camp for Diabetic Youths. The day after the November 22, 2006, deadline for the OHS to sign the agreement, the OHS announced that it had sold the property for housing development to Solmar Development for more than $2 million.

The Town of New Tecumseth announced it would designate the property under the Ontario Heritage Act. This would prevent its commercial development and obligate the owner to maintain it properly. OHS objected. The Ontario Conservation Review Board heard arguments for and against designation in September 2007 and recommended designation of the entire property in October. The Town officially passed the designation by-law on November 12, 2007.

Banting's artwork has gained attention in the art community; A painting of his called "St. Tîte des Cap" sold for Can$30,000 including buyer's premium at a Canadian art auction in Toronto.

Portrayals in film 

He and his insulin discovery have also been depicted in various media formats, including comic books, the biography by Michael Bliss, and on television. The National Film Board of Canada produced a short film in 1958, The Quest.  The 1988 television movie Glory Enough for All depicted the search for insulin by Banting and Best, with R. H. Thomson starring as Banting. Banting is also portrayed by Jason Priestley boarding his fatal flight in the 2006 historical drama Above and Beyond.

Awards and honours
Prior to the award of the Nobel Prize in Physiology or Medicine for 1923—which he shared with Macleod—he received the Reeve Prize of the University of Toronto (1922). In 1923, the Canadian Parliament granted him a Life Annuity of $7,500. Following the Banting's receipt of the Cameron Prize for Therapeutics of the University of Edinburgh in 1927, Banting gave the 1928 Cameron Lecture in Edinburgh. He was a member of numerous medical academies and societies in Canada and abroad, including the British and American Physiological Societies, and the American Pharmacological Society. In 1934, he was knighted as a Knight Commander of the Order of the British Empire (KBE) King George V and became an active Vice-President of the Diabetic Association (now Diabetes UK). In May 1935 he was elected a Fellow of the Royal Society. In 2004, Banting was inducted into the National Inventors Hall of Fame.

Flame of Hope
A "Flame of Hope" was lit by Her Majesty Queen Elizabeth the Queen Mother in 1989 as a tribute to Dr. Frederick Grant Banting and all the people that have lost their lives to diabetes. The flame will remain lit until there is a cure for diabetes. When a cure is found, the flame will be extinguished by the researchers who discover the cure. The flame is located at Sir Frederick Banting Square in London, Ontario, Canada beside the Banting House National Historic Site of Canada.

Time capsule
A time capsule was buried in the Sir Frederick Banting Square in 1991 to honour the 100th anniversary of Sir Frederick Banting's birth. It was buried by the International Diabetes Federation youth representatives and Governor General of Canada Ray Hnatyshyn. It will be exhumed if a cure for diabetes is found.

Honorary degrees

Sir Frederick Banting received honorary degrees from several universities:
 University of Western Ontario (LL.D.) on May 30, 1924
 University of Toronto (D.Sc.) in 1924
 Queen's University (LL.D.) in 1924
 University of Michigan (LL.D.) in 1924
 Yale University (D.Sc.) in 1924
 University of the State of New York (D.Sc.) in 1931
 McGill University (D.Sc.) in 1939

Honorific eponyms
Events
 Banting Lectures, annual lecture series organized by the American Diabetes Association
 Banting Award, highly prestigious award for the best researchers in Canada, valued at $70,000 per year.
Schools
Ontario: Banting and Best Public School, Toronto
Ontario: Banting Memorial High School, Alliston
Ontario: Sir Frederick Banting Secondary School, London
British Columbia: École Banting Middle School, Coquitlam

Tribute
Since 1941, the American Diabetes Association confers Banting Medals for those with long-term contribution to diabetes research and treatment. In 1991, International Diabetes Federation and World Health Organization (WHO) made his birthday the World Diabetes Day. On November 14, 2016, Google celebrated his 125th birthday with a Google Doodle. 2021 marks the centenary of Dr. Banting’s co-discovery of insulin at the University of Toronto. Canada Post issued a commemorative stamp.

References

Further reading
 
 
 
 
 
 
 
 
 
 
 
 
 
 
 Les caprices du Nobel by William Rostène, ed. L'Harmattan (Paris), 2013 (in French)

External links
 

 
 Banting House National Historic Site
  including the Nobel Lecture on September 15, 1925 Diabetes and Insulin
 Ontario Plaques - The Discovery of Insulin 
 CBC Digital Archives - Chasing a Cure for Diabetes
Simcoe County Archives - 'Sir Frederick Banting'
 Famous Canadian Physicians: Sir Frederick Banting at Library and Archives Canada
 World Diabetes Day on Banting's Birthday, November 14
 1928 A.Y. Jackson and Frederick Banting NWT Historical Timeline, Prince of Wales Northern Heritage Centre
 Frederick Banting Papers, Thomas Fisher Rare Book Library 
 The Discovery and Early Development of Insulin Digital Collection, Toronto
 

1891 births
1941 deaths
Physicians from Simcoe County
Scientists from Simcoe County
Canadian medical researchers
Canadian Nobel laureates
Canadian Expeditionary Force officers
Canadian diabetologists
Fellows of the Royal Society of Canada
Nobel laureates in Physiology or Medicine
Members of the United Church of Canada
Canadian recipients of the Military Cross
University of Toronto alumni
Academic staff of the University of Toronto
Academic staff of the University of Western Ontario
Persons of National Historic Significance (Canada)
Canadian Fellows of the Royal Society
Canadian Knights Commander of the Order of the British Empire
Canadian military doctors
20th-century Canadian scientists
Victims of aviation accidents or incidents in Canada
Victims of aviation accidents or incidents in 1941
Governor General's Horse Guards
Governor General's Horse Guards officers